The 2004 Men's World Open Squash Championship is the men's edition of the World Open, which serves as the individual world championship for squash players. The event took place in Doha in Qatar from 28 November to 3 December 2004. Thierry Lincou won his first World Open title, defeating Lee Beachill in the final.

Ranking points
In 2004, the points breakdown were as follows:

Seeds

Draws & Results

See also
PSA World Open
2004 Women's World Open Squash Championship

References

World Squash Championships
W
2004 in Qatari sport
21st century in Doha
Squash tournaments in Qatar
Sports competitions in Doha
International sports competitions hosted by Qatar